Pterolophia quadrigibbosipennis is a species of beetle in the family Cerambycidae. It was described by Stephan von Breuning in 1968. It is known from China.

References

quadrigibbosipennis
Beetles described in 1968